Salvador Machado Agüero (Ocotal, 1838 – Condega, 1925) was a Nicaraguan lawyer and politician appointed interim President of Nicaragua from June 1 to July 16, 1893.

Presidents of Nicaragua
Conservative Party (Nicaragua) politicians
19th-century Nicaraguan people
1838 births
1925 deaths